Natalia Ilinichna Dubova (born 31 March 1948) is a Russian ice dancing coach and former competitive ice dancer.

Career 
Competing as Natalia Bakh with partner Vladimir Pavlikhin, she won the bronze medal at the 1965 Soviet Championships. In 1969, she began coaching at the Sokolniki Arena in Moscow. In September 1992, she moved to Lake Placid, New York. She has coached the following ice dance teams:
 Marina Klimova / Sergei Ponomarenko (from 1979 to 1991)
 Maya Usova / Alexander Zhulin (from 1980 to 1994)
 Oksana Grishuk / Evgeny Platov (from mid-1989 to mid-1992)
 Tatiana Navka / Samuel Gezalian
 Zhang Weina / Cao Xianming
 Elizaveta Stekolnikova / Dmitri Kazarlyga
 Galit Chait / Sergei Sakhnovski
 Shae-Lynn Bourne / Victor Kraatz
 Siobhan Heekin-Canedy / Alexander Shakalov
 Jenette Maitz / Alper Ucar

Dubova was also a consultant for Marina Anissina / Gwendal Peizerat during the 2001–02 season.

She was awarded the Order of the Badge of Honour and the Medal "For Distinguished Labour".  She was also granted the title of Honored Artist of Russian Federation.

Personal life 
Dubova is Jewish. She met her husband, Semyon Belits-Geiman, a former Olympic swimming medalist, when he came to one of her competitions as a sportswriter. In 1999, they moved to Stamford, Connecticut.

References 

1948 births
Living people
Soviet female ice dancers
Russian female ice dancers
Russian figure skating coaches
Figure skaters from Moscow
Soviet Jews
Jewish sportspeople
Sportspeople from Stamford, Connecticut
Female sports coaches